Eggenthal is a municipality in the district of Ostallgäu in Bavaria in Germany. It is located in the Allgäu region.
 
There are the Gemarkungs Bayersried and Eggenthal. There are also the villages of Romatsried and Holzstetten as well as several small hamlets. In Romatsried you will find the Burgstall Romatsried, a place that may have already been populated in the Bronze Age.

Sights

Notable people
Michael Bredl (1916–1999)

References
  (PDF; 1,05 MB)

External links 

 

Ostallgäu